Ondřej Honka (born 20 April 1986) is a footballer from the Czech Republic. He has represented his country at youth level.

References
 
 Profile at iDNES.cz

1986 births
Living people
Czech footballers
Czech First League players
FC Viktoria Plzeň players
1. FC Slovácko players
FC Hlučín players

Association football forwards